Chez l'Ami Louis (Our friend Louis's) is a restaurant at 32, rue du Vertbois, in the 3rd arrondissement of Paris, France, founded in 1924.

The restaurant, which has been called "the world's most famous bistro" and "the worst restaurant in the world", has only fourteen tables and serves meals in a traditional French setting. It was founded by the chef Antoine Magnin, who died in 1987. Gault Millau said of him that he had "an eagle eye for choosing produce" and that the meat and poultry he served was the best in Paris. The current host is Louis Gadby.

L'Ami Louis specializes in traditional French cuisine, including lamb and foie gras. Notable clients have included Francis Ford Coppola and Alice Waters, who has named it as her favourite restaurant. L'Ami Louis has been visited by Bill Clinton and Jacques Chirac, was the venue for the 60th birthday party of writer Anthony Dias Blue, as well as the 70th birthday party of R. W. Apple, Jr. On 12 November 2021, U.S. Vice President Kamala Harris dined there with Second Gentleman Douglas Emhoff.

Notes

External links
review at dininginfrance.com

Restaurants in Paris
Buildings and structures in the 3rd arrondissement of Paris
Restaurants established in 1924
1924 establishments in France